Carl Maria 'Roland' Geldner (23 May 1870 – 1905) was a Swiss businessman and founder member of FC Basel. He was the club's first chairman. He was a well-known personality in the city and long-time player with the first team from the early days of football. He was a distinguished person and was the soul of the club in the early years.

Football career
Geldner was member of the Basel rowing club and during a visit to England with his younger brothers, Max Geldner and Georges Geldner, had seen the new football game. The brothers placed an advertisement in the 12 November 1893 edition of the Basler national newspaper, requesting that a football team be formed and that anyone who wished to join should meet up the following Wednesday at 8:15 in the restaurant Schuhmachern-Zunft. Eleven men attended the meeting, generally from the academic community, founding the Football Club Basel on 15 November 1893. 

Geldner can be considered as the club’s first patron and sponsor. Before the club was formed, he reached an agreement with the land owner, Ms Katharina Ehrler-Wittich, about the Landhof. Straight after the clubs’ foundation, she made the Landhof available, free of charge for the first few years, as a playing surface. Geldner himself owned a plot of ground adjacent and the team were able to use this for their trainings. At the very first meeting Geldner gave the club two brand new footballs. At the club’s second meeting Geldner was elected as the club's first chairman.

Geldner trained with the team and the first football match that the club held was on 10 December against the football team of the club RTV/Realschüler-Turnverein, a secondary school student gymnastics club. Geldner and both his brothers played in this match, which the FCB won two goals to nil. Team mate Charles Volderauer, as businessman, had good connections and used them from the very beginning. As early as June 1894, he organised the journey to visit Strassburger FV. Geldner was with the group that travelled and played in the match, which ended in a 0–8 defeat.

On 21 October 1894 Basel played their first game in Zürich, the city on the Limmat, against Grasshopper Club Zürich. This was very positively commentated by GC in the local newspaper: It really deserves credit for the fact that they dare to travel so far, despite their short existence. Our colleagues in Basel have the same principles as we do. They find that one can only learn the game properly through playing many matches and possibly suffering defeats. Therefore, we pay the highest appreciation to the young club, that has to make significant sacrifices in order to achieve this aim. Despite all expressions of respect, the game on the Zurich swamp-like underground ended with a 0–4 defeat for Basel. After the heated fight between the two teams, the guests were entertained and then accompanied by the hosts to an evening drink and finally to the train station. Because of this, the FCB players looked forward to the return match against GC two weeks later. Over a dozen members gathered at the train station in Basel to accompany the guests through the city and to have a "morning pint" before the match. The spectators were shown an attractive game, which FCB only lost 0–3, they had improved compared to the first leg. It was noteworthy that Basel put the ball in the opponents’ goal twice before half time, but the both goals fell from an offside position. Geldner played in both matches. As in Zürich two weeks earlier, in Basel too, after the game they treated themselves to a dinner and the opponents were also accompanied back to the train station.

Geldner scored his first goal for his club in the home game on 19 May 1995. In fact he scored two goals as Basel won 6–0 against new founded local rivals FC Old Boys Basel. Geldner stayed in the team until into their 1897–98 season. He played his last game with them on 7 November 1897 as Basel were defeated 7–0 by Grasshopper Club.

Between the years 1893 and 1898 Geldner played a total of 23 games for Basel scoring at least those two goals.

Geldner lost his life in 1905 while on a tour in the Swiss alps.

Footnotes

Sources 
 Rotblau: Jahrbuch Saison 2017/2018. Publisher: FC Basel Marketing AG. 
 Die ersten 125 Jahre. Publisher: Josef Zindel im Friedrich Reinhardt Verlag, Basel. 
 Verein "Basler Fussballarchiv" Homepage
(NB: Despite all efforts, the editors of these books and the authors in "Basler Fussballarchiv" have failed to be able to identify all the players, their date and place of birth or date and place of death, who played in the games during the early years of FC Basel)

References 

FC Basel players
Swiss men's footballers
Association football forwards
Swiss football chairmen and investors
FC Basel non-playing staff
1870 births
1905 deaths
Accidental deaths in Switzerland